Syncathartis is a genus of moths of the family Yponomeutidae.

Species
Syncathartis argestis - Meyrick, 1921 

Yponomeutidae